Major General Reginald William Sartorius  (8 May 1841 – 8 August 1907) was an army officer, and a recipient of the Victoria Cross, the highest and most prestigious award for gallantry in the face of the enemy that can be awarded to British and Commonwealth forces.

Life

Educated at Victoria College, Jersey, Sartorius entered the Indian Army in January 1858. He joined the Bengal infantry, became a lieutenant in May 1858 and served in the Indian Mutiny (1858) and the Bhutan War (1864–65). In 1873, now a captain, Sartorius took part in the First Ashanti Expedition, in modern-day Ghana.

VC action
Sartorius was a 32 year old captain in the 6th Bengal Cavalry, British Indian Army, during the First Ashanti Expedition when the following deed took place at Abogu in the Ashanti Region, for which he was awarded the VC. His citation read:

For his Ashanti service, Sartorius was also twice mentioned in dispatches, promoted to brevet major, and made a companion of the Order of St Michael and St George.

Later career
Sartorius served in the Second Anglo-Afghan War (1878–80) and in 1886 became a colonel. His active career came to an end in 1893, when he left India and went to live in Italy. In 1895 he was promoted to major-general, Bengal infantry, and in 1897 was placed on the retired list.

He retired to Haslemere, Surrey. He was a member of the Royal Yacht Squadron, and died suddenly on 8 August 1907 when sailing at Cowes, Isle of Wight. He was buried St Mary's Churchyard, South Baddesley, Hampshire.

Family
His father was Admiral of the Fleet Sir George Rose Sartorius. He had two brothers, both of whom entered the army: George Conrad Sartorius, who retired as a colonel, and Major General Euston Henry Sartorius, who was also awarded the VC. 

In 1877 Sartorius married Agnes Maria Kemp. They had a son, who also served in the Indian Army, and a daughter.

One of Victoria College Jersey's five Houses was later named 'Sartorius' after the three brothers, all of whom attended the school.

The medal
His Victoria Cross is held by the National Army Museum, Chelsea, London.

References

Monuments to Courage (David Harvey, 1999)
The Register of the Victoria Cross (This England, 1997)

External links
Location of grave and VC medal
Profile

1841 births
1907 deaths
British recipients of the Victoria Cross
British Indian Army generals
People educated at Victoria College, Jersey
Victoria Cross recipients from Jersey
British military personnel of the Third Anglo-Ashanti War
British military personnel of the Second Anglo-Afghan War
British military personnel of the Bhutan War
British military personnel of the Indian Rebellion of 1857
Companions of the Order of St Michael and St George